The North Rhine-Westphalia Academy for Sciences and Arts (Nordrhein-Westfälische Akademie der Wissenschaften und der Künste) is a learned society in Düsseldorf, Germany, founded in 1970.

External links
http://www.awk.nrw.de/

Education in Düsseldorf
Culture in Düsseldorf
Union of German Academies of Sciences and Humanities
1970 establishments in Germany
Scientific organizations established in 1970